USCGC Winnisimmet  was one of two Winnisimmet-class harbor tugs constructed for the Revenue Cutter Service in 1903 and stationed at Boston, Massachusetts. The Navy assumed control of her from 6 April 1917 to 28 August 1919 during World War I. In September 1919 she was transferred from Boston to Baltimore, Maryland, where she remained until 1932. She was then assigned to Norfolk, Virginia where she remained in service until being decommissioned in October 1945. Before the U.S. Coast Guard was formed in 1915, she was known as the USRC Winnisimmet.

References
U.S. Coast Guard and Revenue Cutters, 1790-1935, Donald Canney, Naval Institute Press, 1995, 

1902 ships
Ships of the United States Revenue Cutter Service